Atul Mohindra (born 3 August 1966) is an Indian former cricketer. He played eight first-class matches for Delhi between 1986 and 1993.

See also
 List of Delhi cricketers

References

External links
 

1966 births
Living people
Indian cricketers
Delhi cricketers
Cricketers from Delhi